Bryocarpum is a genus of flowering plants belonging to the family Primulaceae.

Its native range is Himalaya to Southeastern Tibet.

Species:

Bryocarpum himalaicum

References

Primulaceae
Primulaceae genera